Tuuli Pauliina Räsänen  is a circus performer and actress from Finland. Her career jump-started when she was invited to perform as the first Fennoscandian soloist with Cirque du Soleil. She was awarded a five-year grant from Finland's Central Commission of Arts to pursuit artistic work. She has succeeded in establishing her career in the international market and at the moment performs with Komische Oper Berlin.

Speciality
Her special skills include aerial acrobatics such as swinging trapeze, aerial silk and aerial hoop. She also performs a hand-to-hand acrobatic act with her Russian partner, Viatcheslav Volkov (born 9 February 1976 in Yaroslavl), a former World Champion of Sport Acrobatics.

Career
Pauliina Räsänen started ballet, painting and gymnastics at a very young age. However, her interests lay more in arts than in competition. She enrolled in the Performing Arts High School of Tampere pursuing her acting, improvisation, and speech. After high school she was accepted into the National Circus School of Montreal, where she trained under their performing arts coaches. Pauliina graduated with a difficult routine of swinging trapeze including an original skill, in which she intentionally dislocates her shoulders while executing a salto around the bar. Cirque du Soleil signed her up as their first Fennoscandian artist, to perform in their production Alegría. She toured with Cirque du Soleil for 5 years until she decided to leave in pursuit of other goals.

While in Cirque du Soleil, Pauliina met her future partner Viatcheslav (Slava) Volkov from Russia. The couple found they shared similar visions in personal life as well as in acrobatics. Together they created a hand-to-hand acrobatic act combining elements of dance, acting, and high-level acrobatics. Their performance music is composed by French accordionist Corinne Kuzma. At the moment the couple lives in Kustavi, a small city in the Southern Archipelago of Finland, and regularly performs in European theaters.

Räsänen and Volkov are currently filming a feature film, Circus Fantasticus for Staragara production. Pauliina was also awarded a 5-year grant from the Finnish Central Commission of Arts to continue her artistic goals in Finland.

ArtTeatro
Räsänen and Volkov own their own Finland-based circus arts company and agency, ArtTeatro Ltd. Its goal is to create intimate, touching, and high-level shows in a family-like atmosphere combining theater and circus arts. Their created a show, Cirque Dracula, will be performed as part of the Turku Culture Capital Event in 2011. The cast includes international performers and singers from Europe and Canada.

Awards
 2008, 5-year grant from Finnish Central Commission of Arts to support Pauliina's artistic projects
 2008, Yellow Crane Prize, Bronze Medal, at Wuhan International Acrobatic Arts Festival in China

Performances
Film and TV credits
2018    Egenland, documentary; role herself, YLE TV1
2010    Circus Fantasticus, feature film by Janez Burger; role Angela
2007    Hitachi, Commercial for TV and internet; role Spiderwoman, Hong Kong
2007    A Leap From the Trapeze, documentary movie by Juha Ikavalko, YLE TV1
2007    France 24, "A day with Pauliina", Interview and performance; Paris
2007    Eurovision Song Contest Finals, Interval Act with Apocalyptica; role trapeze artist; Helsinki
2007    Huomenta Suomi morning TV, MTV3; role guest; Helsinki
2006    Ihana Aamu morning TV, MTV3; role guest; Helsinki
2005    Alegría 2, Cirque du Soleil film; role principal trapeze dancer; Japan
2007    Markku’s Eurovision TV, SubTV; role guest; Helsinki
2002    Balancing, a short film by Orlando Wills; role circus artist; Canada
2002    Diesel Gasoline Commercial; role Bond Girl; Finland
1998    Fire-Eater, feature film; Finland; role stunt performer
1999    McDonald’s Commercial; role circus artist; Canada

Performances on stage
2016–2020  "Petrushka", Komishce Oper Berlin; role Ptishka, Germany
2008    Seven Brothers musical; role Maiden, Venla; Aerial, Hand to Hand; Finland
2008    Variete Krystallpalast, Hand to Hand, Character; Germany
2008    Variete GOP; Hand to Hand, Solo Trapeze, Character; Germany
2007    Eurovision Song Contest Finals, Interval Act with Apocalyptica; Helsinki
2007    Exxonmobil Special Event, Hand to Hand; India
2007-2002   Cirque du Soleil Alegría; Solo Trapeze, Character; World Tour          
2001    Cirque Éloize Cirque Orchestra; Aerial Silk, Hand to Hand

References

http://www.imdb.com/name/nm1387170
http://www.metro.co.uk/fame/interviews/article.html?in_article_id=31675&in_page_id=11
http://www.pauliinarasanen.com
https://web.archive.org/web/20110716094937/http://www.turku.fi/public/default.aspx?contentid=106137
http://www.staragara.com/en/novice/
http://www.turunsanomat.fi/kulttuuri/?ts=1,3:1005:0:0,4:5:0:1:2007-11-09,104:5:497413,1:0:0:0:0:0:

Living people
actresses from Tampere
Finnish actresses
Acrobats
Cirque du Soleil performers
Year of birth missing (living people)